Physaria floribunda, the pointtip twinpod, is a member of the family Brassicaceae.  It is an herbaceous perennial occurring in the United States states of Colorado, Utah, and Arizona.

A variety, Physaria floribunda Rydb. var. osterhoutii (Payson) Rollins (with two synonyms:  Physaria floribunda Rydb. ssp. osterhoutii (Payson) O'Kane, and Physaria osterhoutii Payson), is named in honor of George Everett Osterhout.  It occurs only in Colorado.

References

floribunda